The 2021 Yokohama DeNA BayStars season is the 71st season of the franchise in Nippon Professional Baseball, their 43rd season in Yokohama, and in Yokohama Stadium, and their 10th season under DeNA. This is also the first season under manager and former player Daisuke Miura, who replaced 5 year manager Alex Ramirez.

Regular season 
The BayStars finished dead last in Central League, with a 54-73-16 record, with a .425 winning percentage, 20 and a half games back of the Swallows. They had a bit of an abysmal start in April, because they could not get their foreign talent, but when they got them back on their roster and late into the season, Yokohama showed how dominant their offense was.

2021 Central League Standings

Roster

References

2021 Nippon Professional Baseball season
Yokohama BayStars seasons